The bandfin shiner (Luxilus zonistius) is a freshwater ray-finned fish in the family Cyprinidae, the carps and minnows. It occurs in tributaries of the Apalachicola River drainage in Georgia, Alabama and Florida, adjacent tributaries of Savannah, Altamaha, and Coosa rivers in Georgia, and the Tallapoosa River in Georgia and Alabama. Its preferred habitat is rocky and sandy pools and runs of headwaters, creeks and small rivers.

References

Luxilus
Freshwater fish of the United States
Fish described in 1880